Zachary Lokken (born March 25, 1994) is an American slalom canoeist who has competed at the international level since 2008. In 2019, he won the gold medal in the C1 event at the 2019 Pan American Games in Lima, Peru.

He has qualified to represent the United States at the 2020 Summer Olympics in Tokyo, Japan where he finished 7th in the C1 event.

World Cup individual podiums

1 Pan American Championship counting for World Cup points

References

External links 

 
 

Living people
1994 births
American male canoeists
Pan American Games medalists in canoeing
Pan American Games gold medalists for the United States
Canoeists at the 2019 Pan American Games
Medalists at the 2019 Pan American Games

Sportspeople from Durango
Canoeists at the 2020 Summer Olympics
Olympic canoeists of the United States